Brandy Peter is a Papua New Guinean professional rugby league footballer who plays for the PNG Hunters team in the Queensland Cup and has represented Papua New Guinea twice.

References

Papua New Guinea Hunters
Living people
Papua New Guinea national rugby league team players
Papua New Guinean rugby league players
Year of birth missing (living people)
Place of birth missing (living people)